Santos Magaz Marcos (born July 20, 1958) is a Spanish sprint canoer who competed in the early 1980s. At the 1980 Summer Olympics in Moscow, he finished seventh in the C-2 500 m event while being eliminated in the semifinals of the C-2 1000 m event. Actually he is fitness education teacher at IES Padre Isla León.

References
Sports-Reference.com profile

1958 births
Canoeists at the 1980 Summer Olympics
Living people
Olympic canoeists of Spain
Spanish male canoeists
20th-century Spanish people